The Stubbendieck Great Plains Distinguished Book Prize, formerly the Great Plains Distinguished Book Prize, is an annual literary award awarded by the University of Nebraska–Lincoln to the previous year's best nonfiction book on the Great Plains. The books are required to be full-length, first editions, in English, and published/copyrighted the previous year. Winning the prize is accompanied by a $10,000 cash award. The prize was established in 2005.

In 2012, no winner was chosen due to a change in titling the prize. Before 2012, awards were named for the year the book was published. After 2012, awards were named for the year the award was given.

Between 2013 and 2014, the name of the award was changed from the Great Plains Distinguished Book Prize to the Stubbendieck Great Plains Distinguished Book Prize.

List of winners

References

American literary awards
University of Nebraska–Lincoln